TMX Finance is the parent company to the brands TitleMax, TitleBucks, EquityAuto Loan, and InstaLoan. The company holds more than 900 stores in over fourteen states including Alabama, Arizona, Delaware, Florida, Georgia, Mississippi, Missouri, Nevada, New Mexico, South Carolina, Tennessee, Texas, Utah, and Wisconsin, and an online presence in Idaho. TMX Finance’s brands serve individuals who generally have limited access to consumer credit from banks, thrift institutions, credit card lenders, and other traditional sources of consumer credit.

TitleMax markets easy cash to borrowers with “good credit, bad credit, or no credit” secured by the title to their car. In Dallas, San Antonio, and Austin – which have all passed lending laws – those loans have come with zero percent interest.
After 30 days, however, the loan is due in full. If the borrower cannot pay –TitleMax’s average loan is for $1,300 – the borrower is sent to another TitleMax location outside of the city, where he or she can receive a new, unrestricted loan. The borrower would be free to renew the loan at that location indefinitely. That loan, states a contract given to one borrower, could have an annual rate as high as 310 percent.

TMX is owned by Tracy Young of Savannah, Georgia.

Brands 
TMX Finance is the parent company to TitleMax and changed its name from TitleMax Holdings, LLC, to TMX Finance LLC as of June 21, 2010. TMX Finance oversees 728 stores and employs over 3,300 people nationwide. In almost 1,000 stores, the Company operates as TitleMax; in almost 200 stores, the Company uses a TitleBucks brand. TMX Finance also offers a second-lien automobile product in Georgia under the EquityAuto Loan brand, with operations conducted within 122 TitleMax stores and through 4 standalone stores.

Industry overview 
Customers use the services provided by the alternative financial services industry for a variety of reasons, including that they often: do not have access to traditional credit-based lenders like banks, thrift institutions, and credit card companies; have a sudden and unexpected need for cash due to common financial challenges like medical emergencies, vehicle repairs, divorce, job changes, or other unexpected expenses; are self-employed small business owners with an immediate need for short-term working capital; need a small amount of cash immediately and do not have time to wait for a traditional lender to approve a loan; and see such services as a sensible alternative to potentially higher costs and negative credit consequences of other alternatives, such as overdraft fees, bounced check fees, or late fees.

Acquisition and expansion 
In mid-2011, TMX Finance “reopened its 13.25% secured notes due 2015 with an add-on of $60 million non-fungible bonds.” During the second fiscal quarter ended June 30, 2011, TMX Finance opened or acquired 89 new stores. In Texas, 49 stores were opened. In addition, TitleMax entered Nevada, Arizona, and Florida by acquiring 18 stores in Las Vegas and opening 6 stores in Tucson and 1 store in Pensacola. In May 2011, TMX Finance, closed on an asset purchase agreement Cashback Title Loans, Inc., in which TMX Finance acquired all the title loans related to Cashback locations in Nevada. In June 2011, TMX Finance acquired 14 Rainbow Title Loan Company locations – 6 of which were in Las Vegas, 4 in St. Louis, Missouri, and 4 in Kansas City, Missouri. TMX Finance acquired BudgetLine Cash Advance, LLC, and BudgetLine Cash of Missouri, LLC, in 2011. During the third fiscal quarter ended September 30, 2011, TMX Finance opened or acquired 36 new stores, which included 15 stores in Texas, 6 stores in Virginia, 4 stores in Arizona, and 2 stores in Georgia. There was a total of 8 stores acquired and opened in Missouri and 1 store in Nevada. For the third fiscal quarter of 2011, the Company had revenues of $133.7 million, an increase of $31.2 million from the same period of 2010, and a net income of $16.6 million.

Legality of InstaLoan and Cash Store in Canada 
After numerous class action lawsuits filed in various jurisdictions in Canada (Including Ontario, British Columbia, and Alberta), InstaLoan and sister company Cash Store filed for bankruptcy on April 14, 2014.

On July 7, 2016, after numerous years of litigation, and working around a bankruptcy proceeding, a class action suit totaling CAD$10,000,000 was reached allowing all customers who received a loan with either company after September 1, 2011 a chance to claim a minimum of $50 per loan to cover illegal interest rates and fees charged by the companies while their licences to provide payday loans was revoked.

References 

Companies based in Savannah, Georgia
Financial services companies established in 2010
2010 establishments in Georgia (U.S. state)